Jeff or Jeffrey Meyer may refer to:

 Jeff Meyer (director), American television director
 Jeff Meyer (musician) (born 1979), American bassist
 Jeff Meyer (basketball) (born 1954), assistant men's basketball coach at University of Michigan
 Jeffrey H. Meyer, Canadian scientist
 Jeffrey A. Meyer (born 1963), United States District Judge